Nea Madytos is a village and a community of the Volvi municipality. Before the 2011 local government reform it was part of the municipality of Madytos, of which it was a municipal district and the seat. The 2011 census recorded 1,621 inhabitants in the village. The community of Nea Madytos covers an area of 34.705 km2.

It was founded in the mid-1920s by refugees originating from Madytos (present Eceabat, Turkey).

See also
 List of settlements in the Thessaloniki regional unit

References

Populated places in Thessaloniki (regional unit)